Fillmore National Forest was established as the Fillmore Forest Reserve by the U.S. Forest Service in Utah on May 19, 1906 with .  It became a National Forest on March 4, 1907. On July 1, 1908 Beaver National Forest was added. On September 24, 1923 Beaver was transferred to Fishlake National Forest and the name was discontinued.

References

External links
Forest History Society
Forest History Society:Listing of the National Forests of the United States Text from Davis, Richard C., ed. Encyclopedia of American Forest and Conservation History. New York: Macmillan Publishing Company for the Forest History Society, 1983. Vol. II, pp. 743-788.

Former National Forests of Utah